The British National (Overseas) passport, commonly referred to as the BN(O) passport, is a British passport for persons with British National (Overseas) (BN(O)) citizenship. BN(O) citizenship was created in 1987 after the enactment of Hong Kong Act 1985. BN(O) citizens are permanent residents of Hong Kong who were British Overseas Territories citizens (formerly British Dependent Territories citizens) until 30 June 1997, and chose to remain British by registering for BN(O) citizenship when Hong Kong was a British overseas territory. 

BN(O) citizens do not have the right of abode in the UK. Since 31 January 2021, BN(O) citizens have been able to apply for limited leave to remain to work or study in the UK. They become eligible for settled status (indefinite leave to remain) after 5 years of qualifying residence. BN(O) citizens with settled status can register as British citizens after 12 months. 

The settlement scheme was launched after the imposition of the controversial national security law on Hong Kong by the Chinese Central government. The UK considers the enactment of the National Security Law a clear violation of the one country, two systems principle guaranteed in the Sino-British Joint Declaration, an international binding treaty signed in 1984.

Physical appearance

Cover

BN(O) passports are currently issued in their latest biometric versions (as of 2020) and they bear the "electronic travel document symbol" on the navy blue coloured cover. The text United Kingdom of Great Britain and Northern Ireland is present below the coat of arms of the United Kingdom; the wording British Passport is printed above the coat of arms.

Holder's page
The holder's page, or biographical data page, is identical to the identification page of British Citizen passports with the nationality being indicated as British National (Overseas). The machine-readable zone starts with P<GBR, indicating the United Kingdom of Great Britain and Northern Ireland as the passport's issuing country. The request page, made in the name of the 'Secretary of State' (currently the Secretary of State for Foreign and Commonwealth Affairs), is also identical to that of a British Citizen passport. The nationality on the machine readable zone, however, is GBN rather than GBR.

Each biometric BN(O) passport contains a contactless chip, which stores digital data and includes the holder's personal data, on the Endorsement page.

Popularity

Initial rollout

Since the start of registration for the British National (Overseas) nationality on 1 July 1987, permanent residents of Hong Kong who were British Dependent Territories Citizens could either remain as BDTCs or register for the new type of nationality. People who chose to remain as BDTCs, however, would only be able to renew their BDTC passports for a restricted validity until 30 June 1997, while those who registered as BN(O)s would receive BN(O) passports valid for a full ten years.

Registration for the BN(O) passports was not regarded as a popular, practical option during the early years (e.g. from 1 July 1987 to 21 December 1989, only 15% of newly issued passports were of the BN(O) type; the majority still held the British Dependent Territories Citizen passports). Permanent residents of Hong Kong had until 30 June 1997 to voluntarily register themselves as a British National (Overseas).

After the transfer of sovereignty of Hong Kong

After the transfer of sovereignty of Hong Kong to the People's Republic of China on 1 July 1997, the British National (Overseas) passport became the most popular travel document among the people of Hong Kong. From April 1997 to the end of 2006, the British government has issued a total of 794,457 BN(O) passports. The peak was reached in 2001, when 170,000 were issued in a single year.

Hong Kong permanent residents who are Chinese nationals can also opt for the Hong Kong SAR passport. By 2015, the less-expensive Hong Kong SAR passport has been granted visa-free access to more than 150 countries and territories. This makes the number of visa-free countries of the BN(O) passport comparatively smaller. As a result, only 30,000 BN(O) passports were issued in 2006 against an expectation of a peak in passport renewals.

From 2007 onwards

As of May 2007, there were 800,000 holders of valid BN(O) passports. Some 2.6 million out of the 3.4 million British Nationals (Overseas) did not renew their passports upon expiry. As of 31 December 2015, there were only about 143,200 holders of BN(O) passports.

As British National (Overseas) cannot be passed through jus sanguinis to children of current BN(O)s, any children born on or after 1 July 1997 to parents with British National (Overseas) status only acquired either Chinese nationality or British Overseas Citizen status at birth (although it is possible for a BOC with no other nationalities to be registered as a British citizen). Any British Dependent Territory Citizens with connections to Hong Kong who had failed to register themselves as British Nationals (Overseas) by the end of 30 June 1997 would also be ineligible to make further claims for BN(O) from 1 July 1997, and those people would either become Chinese nationals or British Overseas Citizens.

During and after the 2014 Hong Kong Protests, many BN(O) holders began to renew their passports with 22,022 renewals in 2014, this was up from 7,654 in 2011. The pace of BN(O) passports issued substantially quickened beginning in 2019, with over 150,000 granted in 2019 and over 215,000 granted in 2020. The pace substantially quickened after the UK government announced planned improvements into immigration and residency rights for BN(O) holders in July 2020, with 59,798 issued in October 2020 alone.

As of 24 February 2020, there were 349,881 holders of BN(O) passports and the UK Home office estimates that there are around 2.9m BN(O)s in Hong Kong.

As of 17 April 2020, the number of valid British National (Overseas) passports in circulation was 357,156.

As of 2 October 2020, the number of valid British National (Overseas) passports in circulation was 469,416.

As of 31 December 2020, the number of valid British National (Overseas) passports in circulation was 622,981.

As of 31 December 2022, the number of valid British National (Overseas) passports in circulation was 708,838.

Previous versions of BN(O) passports

The cover of British National (Overseas) passport was originally navy blue, as in all other types of British passport. Earlier, residents of Hong Kong were Citizen of the United Kingdom and Colonies and their relevant passports bore the texts 'British Passport' at the top and 'Hong Kong' at the bottom of the cover.

When machine-readable passports were introduced on 1 June 1990, the cover colour was changed to burgundy. Between 1990 and March 2020, all BN(O) passports sported a burgundy red cover identical to that of the British Citizen passports, albeit without the words "European Union" text at the top part of the cover. These words were featured in the latter until April 2019, when the words were removed, causing their front covers to become identical in appearance to those of BN(O) passports, British Overseas Citizen, British Protected Person and British Subject passports: the text United Kingdom of Great Britain and Northern Ireland above the coat of arms of the United Kingdom; the word Passport printed below the coat of arms, and the "electronic travel document symbol" at the bottom.

Endorsements

HK Immigration Observations - ONLY added on production of a valid HKSAR passport/ HK Permanent ID Card that evidence the Right of Abode in HK      

The British National (Overseas) status itself does not automatically grant the right of abode anywhere (including the United Kingdom and Hong Kong). BN(O) citizens would have had right of abode in Hong Kong before 1 July 1997. The following Hong Kong immigration observation is printed in BN(O) passports:

UK Immigration Observations 

British Nationals (Overseas) enjoy visa-free access for up to six months as a visitor entering the United Kingdom. The following statement is printed in BN(O) passports:

BN(O) citizens are however eligible to apply for limited leave to remain to live, work or study in the UK, with more favourable immigration conditions than being a visitor.

According to the latest BN(O) passport processing guideline issued by the Home Office in September 2021, the following observation is entered onto BN(O) passports:

BN(O) holders who were previously re-admissible to the UK retain the following observation in their passport:

Obsolete Observations 

BN(O) passports issued between 30 March 2019 and 31 December 2020 (the UK's transition period for leaving the EU) contain the following observation: 

Since 31 January 2021, the HKSAR government no longer verifies the immigration status of BN(O) passport holders in Hong Kong. As a result, the observation regarding the Right to Land in Hong Kong is not printed in BN(O) passports from 31 January 2021.

Criticism

The British National (Overseas) passports have been criticised  for being too expensive, as compared to the HKSAR Passport, which has so far gained visa-free access from a similar number of countries as has the BN(O). In December 2013, the Foreign and Commonwealth Office of the United Kingdom announced backsourcing of overseas passport processing to their HM Passport Services in Liverpool. As a result, the fee for renewing BN(O) passports was reduced by 35% as of April 2014.

Counterfeit scandal in the 1990s

In the early years after the transfer of sovereignty of Hong Kong in 1997, the issue of counterfeit British National (Overseas) passports aroused international attention and government scrutiny, as such passports were being manufactured and used by illegal immigrants from the mainland of the People's Republic of China, who wished to gain direct access to the United Kingdom by way of Hong Kong.

Upon crossing the Hong Kong-Mainland China border, those illegal immigrants were easily detected by Hong Kong immigration officers, since the Mandarin-speaking immigrants invariably failed to understand or respond to officers communicating in Cantonese, the first language among Hong Kong's native population.

With the introduction of biometric passports, the BN(O) passport has recovered credibility among the international community. Most immigration officers at major British and European ports of entry have been briefed on the six different classes of British nationality, so that they do not confuse a person using his or her BN(O) passport to cross the borders with other types of British nationals..

Use in Hong Kong
Since July 1997, Hong Kong Immigration Department no longer issues BN(O) passports.

Until 30 January 2021, BN(O) passport holders with the right of abode in Hong Kong could use their BN(O) passports to clear immigration control. 

On 29 January 2021, Associated Press reported that the Chinese Foreign Ministry spokesperson Zhao Lijian announced: "China would no longer recognise BN(O) passports starting from 31 January," in retaliation to the extension of BN(O) civil rights in the UK. On the same day, a similar press release from the Government of Hong Kong, said that starting 31 January 2021, British National (Overseas) passports would no longer be recognised as a proof of identity in Hong Kong and no longer be recognised for immigration clearance by the Immigration Department.

Following media enquiries, several countries and regions announced that they would continue to recognise BN(O) passports, including the United States, Canada, Australia, Germany, France, Spain, Taiwan, Japan, Italy, South Korea, Netherlands, New Zealand, Malaysia, Singapore, Finland and Norway.

Use in Mainland China and Macau
From 31 January 2021, BN(O) passports are no longer recognised as valid documents in Mainland China and Macau. Hong Kong Permanent residents who are PRC citizens must use other travel documents such as Mainland Travel Permit and Hong Kong Identity Card.

Use in the United Kingdom

British Nationals (Overseas) are British nationals but not British citizens, and they are not considered 'foreign aliens' under UK law. BN(O) citizens do not need to apply for residence permits if they remain in the United Kingdom for up to 6 months. As Commonwealth citizens, BN(O) citizens who have leave to remain for longer than 6 months are eligible to register as a voter in the UK. They are also able to apply to join HM Civil Service or HM Armed Forces. After the passage of Hong Kong national security law, the UK government made it possible for BN(O) citizens to move to the UK permanently.

Before July 2020, BN(O) citizens could visit the UK for up to six months (or three months when arriving from the Republic of Ireland). For longer stays or other purposes of visit, they needed to apply for the appropriate visas at UK diplomatic missions overseas.
BN(O) citizens are currently ineligible to request the Registered Traveller service for using automatic e-gates at UK borders.

From 31 January 2021, BN(O) holders will be able to apply for a visa which confers the right to work and study in the UK (known as the BN(O) visa). After continuous residence for five years, BN(O) citizens, like those of other qualifying immigrants in the UK, are eligible to apply for settlement, officially called indefinite leave to remain (ILR). They can subsequently register as a British citizen after they have gained ILR for one year.

Immigration, borders and visas

Hong Kong 

BN(O) passport holders who possess right of abode in Hong Kong normally use their permanent identity cards to enter Hong Kong. 
As of 31 January 2021, BN(O) passports are no longer recognised as a legal travel document to enter or exit Hong Kong.

Macau 

BN(O) passport holders normally use their Hong Kong identity card to enter Macau, allowing them to visit Macau for up to 1 year. As of 31 January 2021, BN(O) passports are no longer recognised as a legal travel document to enter Macau.

Mainland China 

British National (Overseas) status is not recognized by the Government of China, so BN(O) passports are not recognized by Mainland China ports of entry controlled by Ministry of Public Security. In addition, the Government of Hong Kong does not allow BN(O)s to renounce their Chinese citizenship pursuant to the nationality law of the People's Republic of China. Therefore, BN(O)s who wish to visit Mainland China must obtain Mainland Travel Permit for Hong Kong and Macao Residents in advance. Starting from 29 January 2021, China no longer recognises BN(O) passports for travel or identification .

Taiwan

The Taiwanese government continues to recognise BN(O) passports as valid travel documents. To enter Taiwan, BN(O)s must obtain an ″Exit & Entry Permit″ which can be obtained either online at no cost or on arrival for a fee. British officials are able to provide consular assistance to BN(O) citizens in Taiwan.

Working Holiday Visas 
BN(O) passports can be used to apply for working holiday visas in countries where Hong Kong has established a bilateral Working Holiday Scheme. Holders of BN(O) passport are not subject to the annual quota of 1,000 in the UK. In late March 2021, the Hong Kong government told 14 countries to stop accepting a BN(O) passport for an application for a working holiday visa.  However, the British foreign office reminded the Hong Kong government that it had no authority to dictate what passports other countries can recognise, and that BN(O) passports would remain valid British travel documents worldwide.  None of the 14 countries accepted the Hong Kong government's demand.

See also

Visa requirements for British Nationals (Overseas)
British nationality law
British passport

References

External links

GBN – British National (Overseas)passport Details information

British Passport : British Hong Kong (1990 — 1997)

BN(O)
British nationality law
British passports
Hong Kong travel documents
Hong Kong and the Commonwealth of Nations